This is a list of Norwegian Counties by GDP and GDP per capita.

List of Counties by GDP 
Counties by GDP in 2020
 according to data by the OECD.

List of Counties by GDP per capita 
Counties by GDP per capita (without not regionalised GDP) in 2015 according to data by the OECD.

See also 
Economy of Norway

References 

Counties by GDP
Gross state product
 GDP
Norway, GDP